The year 2008 is the 1st year in the history of DREAM, a mixed martial arts promotion based in Japan. In 2008 DREAM held 7 events beginning with, Dream 1: Lightweight Grand Prix 2008 First Round.

Title fights

Events list

Dream 1: Lightweight Grand Prix 2008 Opening Round

Dream 1: Lightweight Grand Prix 2008 Opening Round was an event held on March 15, 2008, at the Saitama Super Arena in Saitama, Saitama, Japan.

Results

Dream 2: Middleweight Grand Prix 2008 Opening Round

Dream 2: Middleweight Grand Prix 2008 Opening Round was an event held on April 29, 2008, at the Saitama Super Arena in Saitama, Saitama, Japan.

Results

Dream 3: Lightweight Grand Prix 2008 Quarterfinals

Dream 3: Lightweight Grand Prix 2008 Quarterfinals was an event held on May 11, 2008, at the Saitama Super Arena in Saitama, Saitama, Japan.

Results

Dream 4: Middleweight Grand Prix 2008 Quarterfinals

Dream 4: Middleweight Grand Prix 2008 Quarterfinals was an event held on June 15, 2008, at the Yokohama Arena in Yokohama, Kanagawa, Japan.

Results

Dream 5: Lightweight Grand Prix 2008 Final

Dream 5: Lightweight Grand Prix 2008 Final was an event held on July 21, 2008, at Osaka-jo Hall in Osaka, Osaka, Japan.

Results

Dream 6: Middleweight Grand Prix 2008 Final

Dream 6: Middleweight Grand Prix 2008 Final was an event held on September 23, 2008, at the Saitama Super Arena in Saitama, Saitama, Japan.

Results

Fields Dynamite!! 2008

Fields Dynamite!! 2008 was an event held on December 31, 2008, at the Saitama Super Arena in Saitama, Saitama, Japan.

Results

See also 
 DREAM

References

Dream (mixed martial arts) events
2008 in mixed martial arts